Nemesia cheiranthus, also known as the long-eared nemesia, is an annual plant native to South Africa, with white and yellow flowers, occasionally with purple markings. The upper petals are long and thin, and there are two typically orange bulbous protuberances on the otherwise yellow lower lip, which may be centrally indented. The leaves are toothed and lance-shaped.

Nemesia cheiranthus is a popular garden plant with two main cultivars, 'Shooting Stars' and 'Masquerade'.

References

Endemic flora of South Africa
cheiranthus